Charlotte of Hesse-Homburg (Charlotte Dorothea Sophia; 17 June 1672 – 29 August 1738) was a Duchess of Saxe-Weimar by marriage to  Johann Ernst III, Duke of Saxe-Weimar.

Life
Born in Kassel, she was the eldest of twelve children born from the second marriage of Frederick II, Landgrave of Hesse-Homburg with Louise Elisabeth Kettler, Princess of Courland and Semigallia.

In Kassel on 4 November 1694 Charlotte married Johann Ernst III, Duke of Saxe-Weimar as his second wife.

After her husband's death in 1707, she received as a Wittum (Dower land) the town of Hardisleben. Her main residence was the Yellow Castle (German: Gelbe Schloss) in Weimar, which was built during 1702-1704.

The guardianship of her only surviving child, Johann Ernest, was given to her brother-in-law William Ernest; however, Charlotte devotedly took care of her son during his illness and death aged 18, in 1715.

Charlotte died in Weimar aged 66. She was buried in the Fürstengruft, Weimar.

Issue
She had four children:

 Charles Frederick (Weimar, 31 October 1695 – Weimar, 30 March 1696).
 Johann Ernest (Weimar, 25 December 1696 – Frankfurt, 1 August 1715).
 Marie Louise (Weimar, 18 December 1697 – Weimar, 29 December 1704).
 Christiane Sophie (Weimar, 7 April 1700 – Weimar, 18 February 1701).

Notes

References
Karl Helmrich:  Geschichte des Grossherzogthums Sachsen-Weimar-Eisenach für Schule und Haus, p. 106. [retrieved 5 October 2014].
Johann Samuel Ersch: Allgemeine Encyclopädie der Wissenschaften und Künste in alphabetischer..., p. 260. [retrieved 5 October 2014].

|-

1672 births
1738 deaths
Charlotte
Charlotte
Charlotte
Daughters of monarchs